Bryan Allan LaHair (born November 5, 1982) is an American former professional baseball first baseman. He has played in Major League Baseball (MLB) for the Seattle Mariners and Chicago Cubs and in Nippon Professional Baseball (NPB) for the Fukuoka SoftBank Hawks.  LaHair is currently manager for the Dayton Dragons, the Cincinnati Reds' High-A affiliate.

Professional career

Seattle Mariners

LaHair was selected by the Mariners in the 39th round of the 2002 Major League Baseball Draft out of Saint Petersburg College.

LaHair spent the  season with the Inland Empire 66ers, the Mariners' Single-A affiliate at the time, where he hit .310 with 22 home runs and 113 RBI, earning a spot in the California/Carolina League All-Star Game.

For , LaHair was promoted to the Double-A San Antonio Missions and later to the Triple-A Tacoma Rainiers. In November 2006, he was placed on the Mariners' 40-man roster.

After playing the entire  season in Triple-A, batting .275 with 12 home runs, LaHair started the  season with the Rainiers. In July , he was called up to the Mariners shortly after the release of first baseman Richie Sexson. The Mariners had called up infielder Tug Hulett directly following Sexson's departure, but sent him back down to make room for LaHair a week later. He made his Major League debut on July 18, 2008, as a pinch hitter, grounding into a double play. His first Major League Baseball hit was a line drive single to right field against the Boston Red Sox.

Chicago Cubs
On January 9, 2010, LaHair signed a minor league contract with the Chicago Cubs with an invite to spring training.

With the Triple-A Iowa Cubs, LaHair won the Pacific Coast League Most Valuable Player Award and Joe Bauman Home Run Award in 2011. He was named the designated hitter on Baseball America's 2011 Minor League All Star team.

He earned a promotion to the Cubs major-league roster in September 2011, and in his debut for the team on September 4, recorded his first Cubs hit, a single off the Pittsburgh Pirates' Charlie Morton.

Prior to the 2012 season, Cubs manager Dale Sveum released a statement saying that Anthony Rizzo would start the season in Triple-A Iowa, making LaHair the everyday first baseman. Following Rizzo's callup to the majors, LaHair was moved to right field.
On July 1, 2012, Lahair, who then was hitting .284 with 13 home runs and 28 RBI, was named to the NL All Star team as a reserve at first base.

On Dec. 23, 2019, LaHair was named to The Athletic Chicago's all-decade second team by columnist Andy Dolan.

Fukuoka SoftBank Hawks
On November 22, 2012, the Fukuoka SoftBank Hawks said that they signed LaHair to a two-year, $4.5 million contract. LaHair can opt out of the deal after 2013, and the deal is worth $5.2 million when the signing bonus and buyout are added. The deal has $2 million in incentives each year, and the Cubs received $950,000 in the deal.

Cleveland Indians
He signed a minor league contract with the Cleveland Indians on February 5, 2014.

Boston Red Sox
In 2015, LaHair signed a minor league contract with the Boston Red Sox. He was released on April 4.

Somerset Patriots
LaHair signed with the Somerset Patriots of the Atlantic League of Professional Baseball for the 2016 season. On November 1, 2017, he became a free agent.

Coaching career
Bryan LaHair was hired in January 2018 to be the Billings Mustangs hitting coach, the rookie ball affiliate of the Cincinnati Reds.

In 2019, LaHair was named Field Staff Manager of the Billings Mustangs. LaHair managed the team for two seasons.

In 2022, LaHair was named manager of the Dayton Dragons.

References

External links

Living people
1982 births
Akron RubberDucks players
American expatriate baseball players in Japan
Baseball players from Worcester, Massachusetts
Cañeros de Los Mochis players
Cardenales de Lara players
Chicago Cubs players
Columbus Clippers players
Estrellas Orientales players
American expatriate baseball players in the Dominican Republic
Everett AquaSox players
Fukuoka SoftBank Hawks players
Inland Empire 66ers of San Bernardino players
Iowa Cubs players
Major League Baseball first basemen
National League All-Stars
Navegantes del Magallanes players
American expatriate baseball players in Venezuela
San Antonio Missions players
Seattle Mariners players
Somerset Patriots players
St. Petersburg Titans baseball players
Tacoma Rainiers players
Tomateros de Culiacán players
American expatriate baseball players in Mexico
Wisconsin Timber Rattlers players